Duval County Public Schools (DCPS) is the public school district that serves the families and children residing in the urban, suburban, and rural areas of the City of Jacksonville and Duval County, Florida. As of 2015, the district had an enrollment of over 129,000 students, making it the 21st largest school district in the United States, and the 6th largest school district in Florida. The district's 196 schools are traditional neighborhood and magnet schools, charter schools, and alternative schools, all of which serve students of various needs.

The district is managed by the Duval County School Board and the Superintendent. Dr. Diana L. Greene has been the Superintendent since July 2018. Current Duval County School Board members are Cheryl Grimes, District 1; Elizabeth Andersen, District 2; Ashley Smith Juarez, District 3; Darryl Willie, District 4; Vice Chairman Warren Jones, District 5; Charlotte Joyce, District 6; and Chairwoman Lori Hershey, District 7.

DCPS has achieved an overall ranking of “B,” according to the Florida Department of Education's school grade system, which is based on the New Florida Standards and Florida Standard Assessments (FSA) test results.

History
In the spring of 1864, J.M. Hawks opened the first free public school in the state, located in Jacksonville. The school was later branded as the Stanton Normal Institute in 1868, with a student body of 400. Duval County paved the way for public education in Florida by establishing the first stand-alone high school in 1877, and the first large-scale public school transportation system in 1898.

Leadership

Duval County School Board 
The district's administrative offices are primarily located on the south bank of the St. Johns River in a six-story building at 1701 Prudential Drive. Duval County Public Schools is governed by the Duval County School Board, a body of seven elected officers, each board member representing a particular geographic area.  School Board districts are somewhat analogous to City Council districts in that there are two council districts in each school board district.  The current School Board members, in order of district number, are Cheryl Grymes, Elizabeth Andersen, Ashley Smith Juarez, Darryl Willie, Warren Jones, Charlotte Joyce and Lori Hershey. Board members are elected every four years with two-term limits, with Districts 4 through 7 elected during midterm election cycles (next in 2022) and Districts 1 through 3 elected during presidential cycles (next in 2020).

Former Superintendents

Schools

DCPS has 163 regular-attendance schools as of the 2015-16 school year: 102 elementary schools, 24 middle schools, 1 K-6 school, 2 K-8 schools, 2 6-12 schools and 19 high schools.  The district also has an adult education system through its Bridge to Success program and Parent Academy, six dedicated ESE schools, as well as a hospital/homebound program, virtual school, and six alternative education centers.

DCPS has used an attendance model of Kindergarten through Grade 5 for elementary schools, Grades 6-8 for middle school and Grades 9-12 for high school since 1991.  Before then, Grade 6 was part of elementary school and Grade 9 was part of middle school (called Junior High in DCPS prior to 1988).  Pre-Kindergarten education is available to all children from the age of 4 through the Early Learning Coalition of Duval's Voluntary Pre-Kindergarten Program.

DCPS has a wide variety of programs available to students within the district, and schools are categorized as either neighborhood, choice, or magnet schools.

Magnet & School Choice 
All DCPS schools offer at least one choice program, special program, or acceleration program to students.  The majority of schools in Duval County are boundary-based and serve students residing within that boundary. Some schools, such as non-dedicated magnet schools serve both neighborhood students as well as students residing outside the school's specified boundary, who are selected via lottery. In February 2016, Duval County Public Schools received a 1.2 million dollar School Improvement Grant for use towards the development of STEM labs in 11 Title-1 schools.

A total of 64 schools offer magnet programs. In addition to the required courses, offer a theme or focus that allows students to explore a special interest, talent or skill in fields such as the arts, aviation, culinary skills, language, law & legal occupations, mathematics, public service, science and technology. Duval County Public Schools contains both dedicated magnets, which do not have set boundaries, and non-dedicated magnets, which are neighborhood schools that also have magnet programs.

Charter schools 
Duval County also contains 34  charter schools. These schools are located within the boundaries of Duval County, and operate under a state sanctioned contract with Duval County Public Schools. While publicly funded, DCPS does not oversee the daily operations and governance of charter schools. Charter schools in Duval county score higher academically and out perform traditional public schools on test scores. In 2019, 89% of charter schools in Duval County scored an A, B, or C grade. Most charter schools in Duval county are on a waitlist lottery system due to the high popularity.

School standings
In 2015, Stanton College Preparatory School and Paxon School for Advanced Studies were named of the top 25 most challenging high schools in the United States.

Newsweek also publishes a "Catching Up" list of 33 disadvantaged schools nationwide that challenge their students to participate in Advanced Placement programs which offer better instruction and a stimulating curriculum designed to improve academic skills and prepare for college. Because fewer than 10% of those sitting for the exams actually pass, the schools are excluded from the Best High Schools list. For 2010, six of the top 11 schools and twelve of the top 22 were located in Jacksonville:

Florida Public K-12 School Rankings are based on data from the Florida Comprehensive Assessment Test (FCAT) provided by Florida Department of Education. Based on FCAT Data, among the state's 72 school districts, Duval County rates as follows: High schools—51, Middle Schools—52, Elementary Schools—42.

In 2007, the district instituted the Educators of Change program to identify future teachers among professionals and other individuals who have achieved success outside of the education field.

On August 23, 2010, Atlantic Coast High School opened for the 2010-2011 school year. It was the first new public high school built in the county since 1990 and cost $78 million. The school was constructed primarily to relieve overcrowding at the two largest high schools in Duval County, Sandalwood and Mandarin.

Demographics 
Jacksonville, Florida is located in Northeast Florida and is the largest city in the contiguous United States in land area. It is ranked as the 12th largest city in the United States in population with more than 800,000 residents. The Jacksonville metropolitan area, including surrounding Clay, Baker, Nassau and St. Johns counties, has a population of more than 1,000,000 residents.

Duval County and the City of Jacksonville merged in 1968, creating a single entity governing all of Duval County with the exception of the beach communities (Atlantic Beach, Neptune Beach and Jacksonville Beach) and Baldwin. The Duval County Public School District includes the beach communities, as well as the City of Baldwin.

Student enrollment  
128,702

Elementary - 56,668

Middle - 21,138

High  - 30,455

Exceptional Schools - 1,441

Virtual School - 303

Alternative Schools -2,319

Charter Schools - 11,951

Graduation Rate: 78.8%

Student ethnicity 
African American- 43%

Caucasian -  34%

Hispanic - 13%

Multiracial - 5%

Asian - 5%

American Indian/Alaskan Native - <1%

Controversies 
On April 13th, 2013, it was reported that towards the end of 2012, a teacher at Cedar Hills Elementary School had students in a 4th grade class write notes stating, "I am willing to give up some of my constitutional rights in order to be safer or more secure."  The students were then told to sign the notes.  Aaron Harvey, a father of one of the students, found his child's note, written in crayon, and brought it to public attention.  In response, Nikolai Vitti, then the superintendent of Duval County Public Schools, stated "The Justice Teaching activity on constitutional rights that was conducted at Cedar Hills Elementary School is consistent with our efforts to broaden civics-based education and develop critical thinking skills among our students. The lesson builds awareness of First Amendment rights through a partnership with an association of local attorneys. Our possible concern rests with a follow-up activity that may have been conducted after the lesson."

Renaming 
Following a petition with 160,000 signatures, Nathan Bedford Forrest High School (1959), originally an all-white school named in protest against school desegregation, renamed Westside High School in 2014 after decades of controversy.Following a petition with 160,000 signatures, Nathan Bedford Forrest High School (1959), originally an all-white school named in protest against school desegregation, renamed Westside High School in 2014 after decades of controversy.

As part of the Removal of Confederate monuments and memorials movement, six schools were renamed during the summer of 2021. 
 Robert E. Lee High School was changed to Riverside High School
 Joseph Finegan Elementary School was changed to Anchor Academy
 Stonewall Jackson Elementary School was changed to Hidden Oaks Elementary School
 J.E.B. Stuart Middle School was changed to Westside Middle School
 Kirby-Smith Middle School was changed to Springfield Middle School
 Jefferson Davis Middle School was changed to Charger Academy

See also 

List of schools in Duval County, Florida

References

External links
Duval County Public Schools Official Website
School Board information

 
Duval County
Government of Jacksonville, Florida
Education in Jacksonville, Florida
1864 establishments in Florida
School districts established in 1864